Heteroponera relicta is a species of ant in the genus Heteroponera. Endemic to Australia, it was described by Wheeler in 1915.

References

Heteroponerinae
Hymenoptera of Australia
Insects of Australia
Insects described in 1915